Alphonse Gemuseus (8 May 1898 – 28 January 1981) was a Swiss horse rider who competed in the 1924 Summer Olympics and in the 1928 Summer Olympics.

In 1924 he and his horse Lucette won the gold medal in the individual jumping competition. They also won the silver medal as part of the Swiss team in the team jumping competition. Four years later he and Lucette finished eighth as part of the Swiss team in the team jumping competition as well as in the individual jumping event.

References

External links
 DatabaseOlympics.com profile

1898 births
1981 deaths
Swiss male equestrians
Swiss show jumping riders
Olympic equestrians of Switzerland
Equestrians at the 1924 Summer Olympics
Equestrians at the 1928 Summer Olympics
Olympic gold medalists for Switzerland
Olympic silver medalists for Switzerland
Olympic medalists in equestrian
Medalists at the 1924 Summer Olympics
20th-century Swiss people